Clendenen is a surname. Notable people with the surname include:

Clarence C. Clendenen (1899–1977), American historian
Jim Clendenen (1953–2021), American winemaker
Mike Clendenen (born 1963), American football player